Hypostomus tapanahoniensis is a species of catfish in the family Loricariidae. It is native to South America, where it occurs in the Maroni basin in Suriname. The species reaches 17 cm (6.7 inches) in standard length and is believed to be a facultative air-breather.

References 

tapanahoniensis
Fish described in 1969
Fish of Suriname
Fish of South America
Catfish of South America